Gordon Graham is an expert on B2B content writing who has worked on 300 white papers. as well as hundreds of other B2B writing projects since the 1990s. Graham was named 2019 Copywriter of the Year by AWAI, the leading training provider for professional copywriters.

Graham has earned numerous writing and service awards from the Society for Technical Communication and the Professional Writers Association of Canada, of which he is a former president. He has also taught business writing at Concordia University in Montreal and Simon Fraser University in Vancouver and through the AWAI. He is widely acknowledged as one of the world's leading experts in white papers, the persuasive essays used on average by 6 out of 10 B2B marketers surveyed between 2013 and 2022 by the Content Marketing Institute.

Career
In his teens, Graham began writing for his CEGEP and university student newspapers. In 1981, he was a co-founder and first managing editor of NOW, the alternative weekly newspaper in Toronto. Since then, Graham has worked as a technical writer, freelance magazine writer, marketing executive, and independent copywriter.

Graham is widely acknowledged as an expert in B2B white papers. He has been described as “the reigning guru of white papers” by author Peter Bowerman and as "the leading expert in that field" by Canadian copywriter Steve Slaunwhite. Graham has written white papers for Fortune 500 companies including 3M, Google, HP, Oracle and Verizon as well as many other smaller firms, and taught marketing writing at firms including Cisco, EA, Ericsson and Sprint.

In 2013, Graham wrote a book, White Papers For Dummies, which has received more than 60 5-star reviews on Amazon. Reviewers have called it, “a must-read… an invaluable resource… a real treasure… terrific… outstanding… the best book of its kind… required reading… excellent in every way.”

In his book and on his blog, Graham has defined the three most common types of white papers, what constitutes a white paper, and observed that white papers have become shorter and more colorful over the past 20 years. Based on an analysis of his 300 white paper projects from 1997 through 2020, Graham has delineated the main reasons why white papers fail  or are less than effective.

Graham believes that the white paper format will continue to evolve, but that their essential goals—to help a business person understand an issue, solve a problem, or make a decision—will continue to be fundamental to B2B content marketing for many years to come.

Works
 White Papers for Dummies, part of the For Dummies series. Hoboken: John Wiley & Sons, 2013. 1st ed., 384 pages.

Citations

External links
 That White Paper Guy, Graham's official site.
 White Papers for Dummies, the website for Graham's book.
 / Gordon Graham, Graham's Amazon Author's page.

Living people
Canadian copywriters
1955 births